Agra Municipal Corporation or Agra Nagar Nigam is the Municipal Corporation responsible for the civic infrastructure and administration of the city of Agra in India. The organization is also known as AMC or ANN. This civic administrative body administers the city's cleanliness and other public services like public health and parks. The head of the AMC is the mayor.

The AMC is responsible for public education, correctional institutions, libraries, public safety, recreational facilities, sanitation, water supply, local planning and welfare services. The mayor and councillors are elected to five-year terms.

List of mayors

Some of the key projects 

 Solar City Plan for Agra
 Nala Safai Project
 Taj International Airport
 Metro Rail in Agra
 Agra Lucknow Expressway
 Night Markets in Agra
 Radio Taxi

See also

 List of municipal corporations in India

References

External links
 

Agra
Municipal corporations in Uttar Pradesh
Year of establishment missing